Acestrocephalus is a genus of characins from South America, with eight currently described species:
 Acestrocephalus acutus Menezes, 2006
 Acestrocephalus anomalus (Steindachner, 1880)
 Acestrocephalus boehlkei Menezes, 1977
 Acestrocephalus maculosus Menezes, 2006
 Acestrocephalus nigrifasciatus Menezes, 2006
 Acestrocephalus pallidus Menezes, 2006
 Acestrocephalus sardina (Fowler, 1913)
 Acestrocephalus stigmatus Menezes, 2006

References
 

Characidae
Fish of South America